Simmu Tiik (born 19 February 1959, in Tartu) is an Estonian diplomat and is the former Ambassador of the Republic of Estonia to Norway and Iceland.

From 2003 to 2006, Tiik was the Ambassador of Estonia to the Republic of Ireland, and from 2009 to 2012 the Ambassador of Estonia to Russia.
On 30 July 2012, Tiik was appointed as the Ambassador of Estonia to Norway and Iceland.

References

Estonian diplomats
1959 births
Living people
Ambassadors of Estonia to Iceland
Ambassadors of Estonia to Norway
Ambassadors of Estonia to Russia
Ambassadors of Estonia to Ireland
Hugo Treffner Gymnasium alumni
People from Tartu
Recipients of the Order of the White Star, 3rd Class